Eugène Etienne (15 December 1844 – 13 May 1921) was a French politician who was a Deputy from 1881 to 1919, Minister of War in 1913, and a Senator from 1920 until his death.

Life

Etienne was born in Oran, French Algeria.

He was employed at the Maritime Messageries and supported Gambetta in his election of 1869, even before the fall of the Second Empire. He was close to Émile Bouchet, radical deputy. In 1878 he was appointed inspector of railways. In 1879, he founded a law firm with Émile Bouchet and Jules Blancsubé. 
He was a Member of the Chamber of Deputies from 1881 to 1919 and a Senator from 1920 to 1921.
He served as Minister of War from 21 January 1913 to 9 December 1913 in the governments of Aristide Briand and Louis Barthou.

Eugène Étienne presided over the Société Gambetta. 
He was also the leader of the colonial party, the founder and president of the Committee of Asia, the French Africa Committee and the Morocco Committee. 
An experienced businessman, he was also Chairman of the Board of Directors of the Compagnie Générale des Omnibus in Paris and a member of the Railway Advisory Committee.

Eugène Étienne was appointed to the board of the Tréfileries et Laminoirs du Havre (TLH) in 1911, left this position when he became Minister of War in January 1913, then rejoined the board the next year and became president until his death in 1921.
He felt that the future of TLH lay in developing the railways and ports of the colonial empire.
As leader of the Colonial group in the chamber of deputies he agitated for expansion of railway lines in the colonies.
Étienne was linked to Robert Pinot of the Comité des forges.

He was elected senator from Oran on 11 January 1920.

He is buried in the Père-Lachaise cemetery (94th Division).

Awards

By a decree of August 15, 1907, Ernest Roume, the Governor General of French West Africa (AOF), named the Port of Levrier (Mauritania), "Port Etienne" 6, today Nouadhibou .

The commune of Hennaya, currently in the wilaya of Tlemcen (Algeria), was renamed in 1922 "Eugène-Étienne". It was a colonization center created in 1851 by General Bugeaud7. The municipality will keep this name until 1962 before returning to Hennaya.

A stele, installed on the Place du Petit Vichy, in the center of Oran, bears the mention "to Eugene Etienne, Oran grateful." One of the great roads of Oran was called Rue Eugene Etienne; It now bears the name of Mohamed Baghdadi; In Tlemcen, the rue Eugène Etienne became rue Commandant Djaber.

Works
Eugène Étienne, Les Compagnies de colonisation, A. Challamel, 1897

References

Sources

External links
 

1844 births
1921 deaths
People from Oran
People of French Algeria
Pieds-Noirs
Democratic Republican Alliance politicians
French interior ministers
French Ministers of War
Members of the 3rd Chamber of Deputies of the French Third Republic
Members of the 4th Chamber of Deputies of the French Third Republic
Members of the 5th Chamber of Deputies of the French Third Republic
Members of the 6th Chamber of Deputies of the French Third Republic
Members of the 7th Chamber of Deputies of the French Third Republic
Members of the 8th Chamber of Deputies of the French Third Republic
Members of the 9th Chamber of Deputies of the French Third Republic
Members of the 10th Chamber of Deputies of the French Third Republic
Members of the 11th Chamber of Deputies of the French Third Republic
French Senators of the Third Republic
Senators of French Algeria
Burials at Père Lachaise Cemetery